St. Stephen's International School may refer to:
St. Stephen's International School Bangkok
St. Stephen's School Rome